Alfred Babcock (April 15, 1805 – May 16, 1871) was a physician, an American politician and a U.S. Representative from New York's thirty-third district.

Biography
Born in Hamilton, New York, Babcock attended the local schools. He also attended the Gaines (New York) Academy. He studied medicine and became a physician.

Career
Babcock moved to Gaines, New York, where he practiced his profession. He was elected a member of the board of trustees of the village of Gaines at its first election on May 28, 1839.

Elected as a Whig to the Twenty-seventh Congress as a U.S. Representative for New York's thirty-third district, Babcock served from March 4, 1841, to March 3, 1843.  He resumed the practice of medicine in Gaines, New York, when his term was over.

In 1850, Babcock moved to Illinois and settled in Galesburg, Knox County, Illinois, where he continued the practice of his profession until his death in 1871.

Death
Babcock died in Galesburg on May 16, 1871 (age 66 years, 31 days). He is interred at Hope Cemetery, Galesburg, Illinois.

References

External links

1805 births
1871 deaths
People from Hamilton, New York
Whig Party members of the United States House of Representatives from New York (state)
19th-century American politicians